John Morris Marsden (1857 – 29 August 1939) was a British solicitor and philatelist who was appointed to the Roll of Distinguished Philatelists in 1921.

References

British philatelists
1857 births
1939 deaths
Signatories to the Roll of Distinguished Philatelists
British solicitors